The Village of Dunnottar is a village in the Canadian province of Manitoba. As part of the Interlake and Metro regions, the municipality is located on the shores of Lake Winnipeg, just off Highway 9, south of Winnipeg Beach.

It encompasses the towns of Ponemah, Whytewold, and Matlock. These centres grew around Canadian Pacific Railway stations. It borders the Rural Municipality of St. Andrews, in addition to Lake Winnipeg. It is known for its beaches, with which comes many summer residents and visitors.

History 
The Village takes its name from Dunnottar Castle in Scotland.

In June 1947, it was announced that the area of current-day Village of Dunnottar would have a meeting to create the municipal government. The meeting was held at 177 McDermot Avenue in the city of Winnipeg. Municipal elections were held later that year in November, officially becoming a village as of 1 January 1948.

Thereafter, Albert J. Smale became Dunnottar's first Mayor. The municipal clerk's office would be located in the Canada Permanent building (298 Garry Street) in Winnipeg.

Demographics 

References

External links
Village of Dunnottar
Manitoba Communities - Dunnottar
Map of Dunnottar at Statcan

Villages in Manitoba
Winnipeg Metro Region
Populated places in Interlake Region, Manitoba